Andrei Georgievich Vedernikov (1 October 1959 —  29 February 2020) was a Soviet cyclist. In 1981 he became the first Soviet cyclist to win the individual amateur road race at world championships, and was named the road racer of the year by the Union Cycliste Internationale.

In 1980, he won the Vuelta Mexico Telmex. Next year, he won the Tour de Slovaquie and finished second in the Milk Race. 

Vedernikov was married and had a daughter, Lena, and a son, Andrei. His brother Mikhail is also a cyclist.

He died on February 29, 2020, on the territory of one of the health resorts in Izhevsk as a result of a falling tree.

References

1959 births
2020 deaths
Russian male cyclists
Soviet male cyclists
Sportspeople from Izhevsk
Accidental deaths in Russia
Honoured Masters of Sport of the USSR